Tebessa district is an Algerian administrative district located in the Province of Tébessa.  Its chief town is located on the eponymous town of Tébessa.

References 

Districts of Tébessa Province